Hellesøy or Hedlesøy is an island in Stavanger municipality in Rogaland county, Norway. The island lies close between the islands of Lindøy and Kalvøy and together, the three islands form a "neighborhood" within the city of Stavanger. In 2016, the three islands had a total combined population of 26. The island is only accessible by boat.

See also
List of islands of Norway

References

External links
Map of Hellesøy

Islands of Stavanger